Kamal Anthony Miller (born May 16, 1997) is a Canadian professional soccer player who plays as a centre-back for Major League Soccer club CF Montréal and the Canada national team.

Early life
Born in the Toronto suburb of Scarborough, Miller is of Jamaican and Trinadadian descent. He began playing youth soccer at age four with Malvern SC. Afterward, he played with North Scarborough SC and Vaughan Azzurri.

College career
Miller played four years of college soccer at Syracuse University between 2015 and 2018. He scored his first collegiate goal on September 22, 2015, against Binghamton. In 2018, he was named to the All-ACC third team and was named to the United Soccer Coaches All-South Region third team.

Club career

Early career
While at college, Miller also played for League1 Ontario club Vaughan Azzurri and USL PDL sides K-W United FC and Reading United AC.

Orlando City
On January 11, 2019, Miller was selected 27th overall in the 2019 MLS SuperDraft by Orlando City. He officially signed with the club on March 1, 2019 and made his professional debut appearance the following day, starting in Orlando's season opener, a 2–2 draw with New York City FC. As part of Orlando's end-of-season roster decisions it was announced Miller had his contract option for the 2020 season exercised.

CF Montréal 
Miller was selected by Austin FC in the 2020 MLS Expansion Draft and immediately traded to the Montreal Impact in exchange for $225,000 in General Allocation Money and a first round pick (11th) in the 2021 MLS SuperDraft. He made his debut for Montreal on April 17 against Toronto FC. After a strong start with Montreal, the club announced on July 12 a contract extension until 2023. Miller scored his first goal for his new club on November 3, scoring the second in a 2–0 win over the Houston Dynamo.

As a result of Miller's strong play for Montreal during the 2022 MLS season, in July 2022 the league announced him as one of the commissioner's picks for the 2022 MLS All-Star Game.

International career

Youth team
Miller was capped at youth level for Canada U20s, competing at the 2017 CONCACAF U20 Championship. Miller was named to the Canadian U-23 provisional roster for the 2020 CONCACAF Men's Olympic Qualifying Championship on February 26, 2020.

Senior team
On March 18, 2019, he received his first senior call-up for Canada for their final CONCACAF Nations League qualifying game against French Guiana. In June 2019, Miller was selected in Canada's 2019 CONCACAF Gold Cup squad and made his senior international debut on June 23, entering as a 61st minute substitute in Canada's final group stage match, a 7–0 win over Cuba. In July 2021 Miller was called up to represent Canada at the 2021 CONCACAF Gold Cup.

In November 2022, Miller was named to Canada's squad for the 2022 FIFA World Cup.

Career statistics

Club

International

Honours
CF Montreal
 Canadian Championship: 2021

Individual
 MLS All-Star: 2022

References

External links

 
 

1997 births
Living people
Soccer players from Toronto
Sportspeople from Scarborough, Toronto
Canadian soccer players
Canada men's international soccer players
Canadian sportspeople of Jamaican descent
Canadian sportspeople of Trinidad and Tobago descent
Association football defenders
Black Canadian soccer players
Canadian expatriate soccer players
K-W United FC players
Major League Soccer players
Orlando City SC draft picks
Orlando City SC players
Reading United A.C. players
Syracuse Orange men's soccer players
USL League Two players
2019 CONCACAF Gold Cup players
2021 CONCACAF Gold Cup players
2022 FIFA World Cup players
Vaughan Azzurri players